Teenage Devil Dolls (released in theaters as One Way Ticket to Hell) is a 1955 American black and white teen crime drama film produced, written and directed by Bamlet L. Price, Jr. The film was made in a quasi-documentary style that has no dialogue, just sound effects and music by Robert Drasnin. The movie is narrated by Kurt Martell, as Police Lieutenant David Jason, but the part of the Lieutenant is portrayed by actor Robert A. Sherry in the film. Price borrowed $4000 from his then-wife Anne Francis to make the film.

Plot
Pert, pretty high-schooler Cassandra Leigh opts for the easy life of a pot-smoking biker to avoid the demands of her neurotic mother. When Cassandra's grades slip, destroying her college plans, she marries a love-smitten swain. But soon the bored young bride looks up her old thrill-seeking buddies, and splits from home.

Soon Cassandra is peddling dope on the streets to finance her growing list of addictions. A young Mexican eventually makes her his partner, in crime and otherwise. With the police on their heels, the young lovers are forced to ditch a stolen car in the desert and take refuge in a shallow cave.  As the posse closes in, he abandons her and the deputies nab her when she's semi-conscious. The court sends her to a Federal Narcotics Hospital.

Cast
 Barbara Marks as Cassandra Leigh 
 Kurt Martell as the Narrator, Lt. David Jason
 Robert A. Sherry as Lieutenant David Jason  
 Bamlet Lawrence Price, Jr. as Miguel 'Cholo' Martinez 
 Lucille Price as Cassandra's Mother
 Bamlet Lawrence Price, Sr. as Cassandra's Current Stepfather
 William Kendell as Russell Packard
 Robert Norman as Johnny Adams
 Elaine Lindenbaum as Margo Rossi
 Joel Climenhaga as Sven Bergman
 Joe Popavich as Al Stutzman
 Anthony Gorsline as Jimmy Sanchez
 Victor Schwartz as Sergeant Schwartz

Reviews
The New York Times (December 8, 1955) was highly critical in their review of the film writing: "The sensationalism implicit in the title of One-Way Ticket to Hell is hardly evident in this depiction of drug addiction and narcotics traffic...a case history of a young girl's descent into enslavement to the habit, this obviously serious attempt to illustrate and warn against the disastrous effects of the evil emerges largely as an unimaginative cops-and-robbers-type melodrama. Although its intentions are undoubtedly noble this latter-day parable  is crude and without force...there is no dialogue, the story is related in "voice-of-doom" fashion by...the off-screen narrator - it affords its cast little opportunity to develop character. Bamlet L. Price Jr...plays Cholo Martinez, one of the villains who leads the heroine astray, may be listed as an ambitious and busy man. Nothing more. Barbara Marks only occasionally rises to the emotional levels called for in the role of the disturbed lass who drifts from a broken home to an eventually broken marriage, to marijuana, sleeping pills and heroin. The other members of the cast are not effective. Neither is One-Way Ticket to Hell."

Steven Pulchaski's review in his book, Slimetime: A Guide to Sleazy, Mindless Movies, was devastating, writing - "this is an obscure, anti-drug, anti-juvenile delinquent anti-rebellion morality story, all told in not-so-glorious Dragnet style narration...it's overwrought, paranoid, fearmongering, and totally idiotic...basically, this is drug-paranoia propaganda at its bleakest and least entertaining, with grainy black and white photography, static direction...it just drones on for sixty-or-so minutes, and though the plot tries to be controversial and hard-hitting, the flick is actually so unsleazy that it never gets off the ground".

Leonard Maltin rated the movie D saying it was "Yet another entry in the Reefer Madness school of filmmaking, about an insecure, discontented teen girl's descent into drug addiction and crime. Presented as a case history and without dialogue; there's only narration and sound effects."

End credits
The film ends with a cautionary message:

References

External links
  
 
 
 
Times Square Grindhouse (1955)

1955 crime drama films
1955 films
American black-and-white films
Films shot in Los Angeles
American teen films
1950s teen films
American crime drama films
1950s English-language films
1950s American films